Microbisium brunneum is a species of pseudoscorpion in the family Neobisiidae.

References

Further reading

 

Neobisiidae
Articles created by Qbugbot
Animals described in 1868